In mathematics, Out(Fn) is the outer automorphism group of a free group on n generators.  These groups play an important role in geometric group theory.

Outer space

Out(Fn) acts geometrically on a cell complex known as Culler–Vogtmann Outer space, which can be thought of as the Teichmüller space for a bouquet of circles.

Definition
A point of the outer space is essentially an -graph X homotopy equivalent to a bouquet of n circles together with a certain choice of a free homotopy class of a homotopy equivalence from X to the bouquet of n circles. The sum of all weights should be 1 and all weights  should be positive. To avoid ambiguity (and to get a finite dimensional space) it is furthermore required that the valency of each vertex should be at least 3.

A more descriptive view avoiding the homotopy equivalence f is the following. We may fix an identification of the fundamental group of the bouquet of n circles with the free group  in n variables. Furthermore, we may choose a maximal tree in X and choose for each remaining edge a direction. Consider the closed path starting with e and then going back to the origin of e in the maximal tree. Composing this path with f we get a closed path in a bouquet of n circles and hence an element in its fundamental group . This element is not well defined; if we change f by a free homotopy we obtain another element. It turns out, that those two elements are conjugate to each other, and hence we can choose the unique cyclically reduced element in this conjugacy class. It is possible to reconstruct the free homotopy type of f from these data. This view has the advantage, that it avoids the extra choice of f and has the disadvantage that additional ambiguity arises, because one has to choose a maximal tree and an orientation of the remaining edges.

The operation of Out(Fn) on the outer space is defined as follows. Every automorphism g of  induces a self homotopy equivalence g′ of the bouquet of n circles. Composing f with g′ gives the desired action. And in the other model it is just application of g and making the resulting word cyclically reduced.

Connection to length functions
Every point in the outer space determines a unique length function . A word in  determines via the chosen homotopy  equivalence a closed path in X. The length of the word is then the minimal length of a path in the free homotopy class of that closed path. Such a length function is constant on each conjugacy class. The assignment  defines an embedding of the outer space to some infinite dimensional projective space.

Simplicial structure on the outer space
In the second model an open simplex is given by all those -graphs, which have combinatorically the same underlying graph and the same edges are labeled with the same words (only the length of the edges may differ). The boundary simplices of such a simplex consists of all graphs, that arise from this graph by collapsing an edge. If that edge is a loop it cannot be collapsed without changing the homotopy type of the graph. Hence there is no boundary simplex. So one can think about the outer space as a simplicial complex with some simplices removed.

Structure
This map is onto, making  a group extension,

.

In the case , the map  is an isomorphism.

Analogy with mapping class groups
Because  is the fundamental group of a bouquet of n circles,  can be described topologically as the mapping class group of a bouquet of n circles (in the homotopy category), in analogy to the mapping class group of a closed surface which is isomorphic to the outer automorphism group of the fundamental group of that surface.

See also
Train track map
Automorphism group of a free group
Outer space

References

Geometric group theory